Gayle is a surname. Notable people with the surname include:

Charles Gayle (born 1939), American jazz musician
Chris Gayle (born 1979), West Indian cricketer
Crystal Gayle (born 1951), Country and pop singer
Dwight Gayle (born 1990), English footballer
Gordon D. Gayle (1917–2013), United States Marine Corps brigadier general and historian
Helene D. Gayle (born 1955), American physician
John Gayle (Alabama politician) (1792–1859), Governor of US state of Alabama
John Gayle (footballer) (born 1964), English footballer
Marcus Gayle (born 1970), English-born Jamaican footballer
Michelle Gayle (born 1971), English actress and singer
Mike Gayle (born 1970), British author and freelance journalist
Peta-Gaye Gayle (born 1979), Jamaican sprinter
Shaun Gayle (born 1962), American football player
Tajay Gayle (born 1996), Jamaican long jumper
W. A. Gayle (1896-1965), American politician
William D. Gayle (1859-1936), American businessman and politician